Dame Inga Kristine Beale, DBE (born 15 May 1963) is a British businesswoman and the former CEO of Lloyd's of London. In June 2018, it was announced that she would be stepping down as CEO of Lloyd's after leading the global insurance and reinsurance market for five years, embedding modernisation and cultural change during her tenure.

Early life and education
Beale is the second child of an English father and a Norwegian mother. She studied economics and accounting at Newbury College, Berkshire.

Career
Beale started her career in 1982 at Prudential Assurance Company in London. She trained as an underwriter, specialising in international treaty reinsurance. The industry was composed predominantly of men at the time; she once took issue with posters in the office depicting half-naked women, only to have her colleagues plaster them across her computer and chair.

She took a year off in 1989, cycling in Australia and backpacking in Asia. She left Prudential in 1992 to work as an underwriter in General Electric's insurance division. She joined GE's management in Kansas in 2001. She continued on with GE Insurance Solutions until 2006, taking leadership roles in Paris and Munich. Beale then headed Swiss reinsurer Converium, turning the company around. In 2008, she joined Zurich Insurance Group as a member of their Group Management Board. The following year she was named the group's Global Chief Underwriting Officer. From 2012–13, she was the Group CEO at the privately held Lloyd's insurer Canopius.

Beale was announced as the new CEO of Lloyd's of London in December 2013, replacing Richard Ward. She is Lloyd's first female CEO in the insurance market's 328-year history.

Beale, who is bisexual, has been instrumental in the launch of Pride@Lloyds, an internal LGBT employee resource group, and has supported the LGBT Insurance Network.

She helped start the international Insurance Supper Club for leading female executives. In 2015 Beale became the first woman and the first openly bisexual person to be named number one in the OUTstanding & FT Leading LGBT executive power list.

Beale is the Chair of the HIV Commission established by UK AIDS charities the Terrence Higgins Trust and National AIDS Trust. The year-long Commission will publish its recommendations in spring 2021.  The UK Government has committed to end HIV transmission in the country by 2030 and will develop its action plan once it receives the HIV Commission’s report.

Beale was appointed Dame Commander of the Order of the British Empire (DBE) in the 2017 New Year Honours for services to the economy.

Brexit 
Beale was an active advocate for the need for a settled business operating environment within the UK. At the World Economic Forum in 2018, Beale expressed concerns over the impact on business of remaining Brexit uncertainties as Brexit negotiations enter a second phase to focus on a trade deal once the UK leaves the European Union.

Personal life
Beale played competitive rugby for London's Wasps into her thirties, nearly making it to the international level. In 2013 she married Philippe Pfeiffer, a Swiss jewellery designer, and the couple live in Spitalfields.

References

External links
Inga Beale at Lloyd's

1963 births
Living people
British chief executives
British women business executives
British businesspeople in insurance
Insurance underwriters
English LGBT rights activists
Bisexual women
Dames Commander of the Order of the British Empire
Date of birth missing (living people)